Rasbora ornata is a species of cyprinid fish endemic to Manipur in India where it occurs in two rivers, the Chatrickong River and Lokchao River, both tributaries of the Yu River. It is threatened by habitat destruction and is traded for the aquarium hobby.

References 

Rasboras
Cyprinid fish of Asia
Fish of India
Fish described in 2005